Hamdi Quran is a member of the Popular Front for the Liberation of Palestine. He came to prominence when he was one of a four-man PFLP team which assassinated Rehavam Ze'evi, the Tourism Minister of Israel, on 17 October 2001. In 2002, Quran was sentenced by the Palestinian National Authority to 18 years for the crime and imprisoned in a Jericho prison under the supervision of British and American wardens under a deal worked out between US President, George W. Bush and Israeli Prime Minister, Ariel Sharon, in April 2002.

In early 2006, the newly elected Hamas government announced its intention to release Ze'evi's assassins. The US and British supervisors guarding the Palestinian prisoners in Jericho prison were removed due to safety concerns on 14 March 2006, and on the same day the Israeli Defense Forces besieged the prison in Operation Bringing Home the Goods, taking Quran and five other security prisoners into Israeli custody. Quran was sentenced by an Israeli court to life imprisonment for the Zeevi assassination,  and was given 100 years for other shootings and bombings against Israelis.

References 

Year of birth missing (living people)
Living people
Anti-revisionists
Popular Front for the Liberation of Palestine members
Palestinian assassins
Palestinian people imprisoned by Israel
Prisoners and detainees of the Palestinian National Authority
Prisoners sentenced to life imprisonment by Israel
Palestinian prisoners sentenced to life imprisonment
People convicted of murder by Israel
Palestinian people convicted of murder